Inoki, also known as Inoki Ness, pseudonym of Fabiano Ballarin (Rome, October 2, 1979), is an Italian rapper and record producer.

It owes its nickname to its old Enok tag, which he later associates with the Old Testament character Enoch. "Ness", on the other hand, is a Bolognese slang expression to indicate who "knows". Furthermore, as he himself stated, the stage name also derives from Antonio Inoki, a well-known Japanese wrestler.

Discography

Solo

Studio albums 

 2001 – 5º Dan
 2005 – Fabiano detto Inoki
 2007 – Nobiltà di strada
 2014 – L'antidoto
 2021 – Medioego

Mixtapes 

 2006 – The Newkingztape Vol. 1
 2008 – Street Kingz Vol. 1
 2008 – Street Kingz Vol. 2
 2010 – Pugni in faccia (with Mad Dopa)
 2011 – Flusso di coscienza
 2016 – Basso profilo - The Mixtape

Singles 

 2005 – Bologna by Night 2004
 2007 – Sentimento reciproco
 2007 – Il mio paese se ne frega
 2012 – L'antidoto
 2020 – Trema
 2020 – Nomade
 2021 – Ispirazione

With Porzione Massiccia Crew 

 1998 – Demolizione 1
 2002 – Demolizione 2
 2004 – PMC VS Club Dogo - The Official Mixtape (with Dogo Gang)

Collaborations 
 1998 – DJ Lugi ft. Inoki, Joe Cassano – 50 MCs (from 50 MCs Pt. II)
 1999 – Fritz da Cat ft. Inoki & Joe Cassano – Giorno e notte (from Novecinquanta)
 1999 – Joe Cassano ft. Inoki, Lord Bean, Fritz da Cat – Gli occhi della strada (from Dio lodato)
 1999 – Joe Cassano ft. DJ Lugi, Devonpepse, A. Cassano, Inoki, Camelz, P – Tributo (da Dio lodato)
 1999 – Inoki e DJ Skizo feat. Royal Rae – Gioventù bruciata
 1999 – Uomini di Mare ft. Inoki – Entro il 2000 (from Sindrome di fine millennio)
 2000 – Inoki feat Zippo – Cammino sul tempo (from Missione Impossibile)
 2001 – Michel ft. Inoki – Siamo noi (from Chempions League)
 2002 – Shezan Il Ragio ft. Inoki, Lama Islam – Bolo – Collabo (from Randagio Sapiens)
 2003 – Inoki feat. Tekno Mobil Squad – Battaglia quotidiana (soundtrack film Fuori vena)
 2004 – Amir and Mr. Phil ft. Inoki – Cosa c'è? (from Naturale)
 2004 – DJ Shocca ft. Inoki, Royal Mehdi – Bolo by Night (from 60 Hz)
 2004 – Rischio ft. Inoki, Gora – Lo spettacolo è finito (from Lo spettacolo è finito)
 2005 – Flaminio Maphia ft. Inoki, Benetti DC, KO – Rapper do vai (from Per un pugno di euri)
 2005 – Marracash ft. Inoki – Il gioco (da Roccia Music Vol. 1)
 2005 – Michel ft. Inoki – Cash Dreamin''' (from ...Da lontano)
 2005 – Mr. Phil ft. Amir, Inoki, DJ Double S – Cosa c'è? (Kill Phil Remix) (from Kill Phil)
 2005 – Mr. Phil ft. Inoki, Lord Bean, DJ Gengiz – Live Illegal (from Kill Phil)
 2006 – Amir ft. Santo Trafficante, Inoki, Tek Money – Prestigionewkings (from Prestigio Click Bang vol. 1)
 2006 – DJ Fede ft. Inoki, A. S.K. – Try One More Time (from Rock the Beatz)
 2006 – Esa aka El Prez ft. Inoki, Killa Tek – Trappole e regole (fromTu sei bravo)
 2006 – Gel e Metal Carter ft. Inoki, Noyz Narcos – Censura (from I più corrotti)
 2006 – Gué Pequeno e DJ Harsh ft. Inoki – Più pesante del cielo (from Fastlife Mixtape)
 2007 – DDP ft. Inoki – Fatti così (from Attitudine)
 2007 – DJ Skizo ft. Inoki, Tommy Tee – Libero (from Broken Dreams)
 2007 – Frank Siciliano e DJ Shocca ft. Inoki, Tek Money, DJ Double S – It's the New! (from Struggle Music)
 2007 – Micrawnauti ft. Inoki – Karateknixxx (from Raw)
 2008 – Big Aim & Yaki ft. Inoki, Jake La Furia – Per me va bene (from Hagakure)
 2008 – Big Aim e Yaky ft. Inoki, New Kingz – Street Disco (from Hagakure)
 2008 – Big Aim e Yaky ft. Inoki, New Kingz – Tu non sei (from Hagakure)
 2008 – DJ Gengiz & Noyz Narcos ft. Inoki – My Cocktail (from The Best Out Mixtape)
 2008 – Micromala ft. Inoki e Pass – Malakingz (from Colpo grosso)
 2008 – Mr Seyo aka Ony ft. Inoki, Tek Money – Streetkingzfreesta (from Back to the Future)
 2008 – Santo Trafficante ft. Inoki, Duke Montana – Split Personality (from Ghiaccio - Il principio)
 2008 – Duke Montana ft. Inoki, Seppia – Senza soldi (from Street Mentality)
 2009 – Gente De Borgata ft. Inoki – Il suono indiscutibile (from Terra terra)
 2009 – Zinghero ft. Inoki, Chicoria – Il paese delle meraviglie (from Fiji de na lupa)
 2010 – Nico Royale ft. Inoki, Kalafi – No Friend Gal 2010 – Debbit, Corax, Losk e Inoki – Rapocalisse (from  Unfamily)
 2010 – Mic Meskin feat. Inoki – Bolo Giants 2010 – Mic Meskin feat. Inoki – Vedo 2010 – Mic Meskin feat. Inoki – Nuovo giorno 2010 – Mic Meskin feat. Big Noyd, Havoc, Inoki – Bona lè 2010 – Wave MC ft. Inoki – Il bivio 2010 – Siamesi Brothers & DJ Skizo ft. Inoki – Io ne voglio da te 2010 – Timmy Tiran feat. Inoki – Usa e getta 2010 – Marciano feat. Inoki – Senti questa musica 2011 – Assalti Frontali ft. Inoki ed Esa – Banditi nella sala 2011 – Marciano feat. Inoki Ness – On the Rockz 2012 – Shafy Click feat. Inoki – Incontenibile 2012 – Freestyle Concept feat. Clementino, Inoki Ness & L-Mizzy – Fight 2012 – Inoki Ness e Timmy Tiran – Vigile vigila 2012 – Mr Chinasky feat. Inoki – Degrado 2012 – Lama Islam feat. Nunzio Streetchild, Naser, Mopashà, Inoki Ness – Hip Hop Worldwide 2012 – Inoki feat. Simon – Fame RMX 2013 – Siruan feat. Inoki – Ingannati 2015 – Miss Simpatia feat. Inoki, Tiz – Fase REM 2016 – Brain feat. Inoki Ness – Pescatore di sogni 2016 – Assalti Frontali feat. Inoki Ness – Mille gruppi avanzano 2016 – Zinghero feat. Inoki Ness – Fatto de rap 2016 – DJ Skizo feat Inoki Ness – Freshness 2016 – 100 Bronx feat. Inoki Ness – Rose bianche 2017 – Brain feat. Inoki Ness – Street Requiem 2017 – Zinghero & Saga feat. Inoki Ness – Paranoie 2017 – Call2Play, Kiave, Terron Fabio, Patto MC, Mattak, GentleT – L'unica soluzione 2.0 2017 – Inoki Ness – Barona by Night (RedBull Culture Clash Dubplate) 2017 – Inoki Ness feat. Big Rapo e Mazza Ken – We Going On 2018 – Vacca feat. Inoki Ness – Blood a Blood 2018 – L'Elfo feat. Inoki Ness – Capo 2019 – En?gma feat. Inoki Ness – Apatia 2019 – DJ Fastcut Feat. Inoki Ness, Lord Madness – Nuvole 2019 – Mauras feat. Inoki Ness, Bonnot, Willie Peyote – Capìtalunedi 2020 – Parola Vera feat. Inoki Ness – Slang & Tattoo''

References 

1979 births
Italian rappers
Living people